Bruce Wilkinson is the founder and chairman of Teach Every Nation (TEN), an Evangelical parachurch organization. He is best known for founding Walk Thru the Bible, an evangelical Christian educational organization, with Howard Hendricks, and for his book The Prayer of Jabez.

Biography
He was born in New Jersey and graduated from Northeastern Bible College (B.A. and Th. B.), Dallas Theological Seminary (Th. M.) and Western Conservative Baptist Seminary (D.D.).

In 1976, Wilkinson launched "Walk Thru the Bible.” He has trained in the "Teaching for Life Change" and is a trainer in the "Dream Giver" methodology. He launched and led WorldTeach, which has recruited and trained leaders to conduct life skills courses. Wilkinson also produced a motion picture about AIDS called Beat the Drum.

After the fall of the Soviet Union in 1991, Wilkinson traveled to Russia to teach in conjunction with the presentation of the Jesus film. Wilkinson served five years as chairman of Co-Mission, an education ministry in Russia.

In 2002, Wilkinson moved with his family to South Africa and founded an organization called "Dream For Africa". In that, Wilkinson launched "Heart for Africa", which mobilized volunteers to plant backyard vegetable gardens for orphans and the hungry. He also launched a movement to recruit college students to conduct AIDS training in high schools.

Wilkinson founded "Teach Every Nation" (TEN) in 2013. TEN was formed to provide "innovative, practical and culturally relevant training" for pastors and leaders in the global South (i.e. areas of Africa, Asia, and South/Central America). Training is provided through simulcasts and in-person courses on TEN's training campus located in the Waterberg Biosphere of northern South Africa. Wilkinson's ministries have also reached Swaziland, a country whose king, Mswati III, Wilkinson tried unsuccessfully to meet during the early 2000s, leading Wilkinson to quit his ministry.

Wilkinson has also raised funds for other ministries. He serves as the chairman of the board of the Exponential Group.

Personal life

Bruce and Darlene Wilkinson have three married children and ten grandchildren.

Books
 Victory Over Temptation
 Walk through the Bible
 Youthwalk Again 
 The Wilkinson & Boa Bible Handbook , 
 Talk Through The Bible 
 Talk Through the Old Testament
 Talk Through the New Testament
 Talk Through Bible Personalities 
 7 Laws of the Learner 
 Almost Every Answer for Practically Any Teacher (Gold Medallion winner) 
 Personal Holiness in Times of Temptation 
 Experiencing Spiritual Breakthroughs (based on his “The Three Chairs” seminar) 
 30 Days to Spiritual Breakthroughs 
 The Prayer of Jabez (October 2000) 
 Living the Jabez Miracle
 The Prayer of Jabez for Young Hearts 
 The Prayer of Jabez for Little Ones (with Melody Carlson) 
 The Prayer of Jabez for Kids (with Melody Carlson) 
 Secrets of the Vine (October 2001) 
 Secrets of the Vine for Little Ones 
 Secrets of the Vine for Kids 
 Secrets of the Vine for Teens (March 2003) 
 A Life God Rewards (October 2002) 
 A Life God Rewards for Teens (October 2002) 
 A Life God Rewards for Kids 
 Set Apart 
 30 Days to Discovering Personal Victory Through Holiness 
 The Dream Giver (October 2003) 
 The Dream Giver for Parents (September 2004) 
 Beyond Jabez 
 You Were Born for This  - 
 The Freedom Factor

Wilkinson served on the overview committee for the New King James Version of the Bible, authored the Books of the Bible outlines, and co-edited the Bible book introductions for The Open Bible. He is the executive editor of four Bibles including The Daily Walk Bible (NIV, NL, NKV, RSV), The Closer Walk New Testament (NIV), The Youth Walk Bible (NIV), and The Family Walk Bible (NIV).

References

External links
 Bruce Wilkinson's Personal Site
 InnerVIEWS with Ernie Manouse: Bruce Wilkinson (TV Interview)

Living people
20th-century evangelicals
21st-century evangelicals
American evangelicals
American expatriates in Russia
Baptists from New Jersey
Dallas Theological Seminary alumni
Evangelical writers
Leaders of Christian parachurch organizations
Multnomah University
Northeastern Bible College alumni
Promise Keepers
Prosperity theologians
Western Seminary alumni
Year of birth missing (living people)